Unoponchash Batash is a 2020 Bangladeshi romantic drama film. It has remarked independent film director Masud Hasan Ujjal's first full-length feature film. The film stars Sharlin Farzana & debutant Imitiaz Barshon in lead roles. It is Sharlin Farzana's first film in lead role.

It was scheduled to release on 13 March 2020 but postponed due to coronavirus outbreak. The film is produced by Asif Hanif under the banner of Red October Films when Syeda Shaon is the executive producer. Bassbaba Sumon will make his playback debut with the film.  Apart from directing, the story, dialogues, screenplay, art direction and music direction of the film also done by Masud Hasan Ujjal.

The film was released on 23 October 2020 in Dhaka's Star Cineplex and Chittagong's 'Silver Screen' cinema theater. It was also released in Narayanganj's 'Cinescope' cinema hall.

Plot
Nira is a Dhaka University student with a well-to-do family, she suddenly falls in love with a man who is a sales representative of medicines and is from a low-income family, despite the latter's educational qualification and income being low, Nira starts to love him passionately.

Suddenly the man dies of cancer and Nira gets mentally unhealthy; though she married him when he was admitted in hospital. Nira goes under a delusion, she sees that her husband is coming alive from graveyard. Nira works as a teacher in Dhaka University where she studied.

Cast
 Sharlin Farzana - Nira
 Imtiaz Barshan - Ayan
 Elora Gohor
 Enamul Haque
 Faria Shams Sheoti
 Lamyea Ahmed - Aurthi

References

External links

Bengali-language Bangladeshi films
Bangladeshi romantic drama films
2020 films
2020 romantic drama films
2020s Bengali-language films